Entmemacornis is a genus of snout moths. It was described by Harrison Gray Dyar Jr. in 1919.

Species
Entmemacornis proselytes Dyar, 1919
Entmemacornis pulla Heinrich, 1956

References

Phycitinae